Ayur or Ayyur may refer to:
 Ayur, Fars, Iran
 Bab Ayur, Fars Province, Iran
 Eivar, North Khorasan, Iran
 Ivar, Razavi Khorasan, Iran
 Ayoor, Kerala, India
 Ayyur, Ariyalur, Tamil Nadu, India